Louis-Léon Cugnot (Paris 17 October 1835 – 19 August 1894) was a French sculptor.

Life 

Cugnot was born in Paris, son of the sculptor Etienne Cugnot.  He entered the École nationale supérieure des Beaux-Arts in the 1850s under teachers Francisque Joseph Duret and Georges Diebolt.  Cugnot took the Prix de Rome in 1859 along with co-winner Alexandre Falguière, and was a pensioner of the Villa Medici in Rome from 1860 to 1863.

In 1874 he was made a Knight of the Legion of Honor.

Work 

Cugnot's work includes:

 Drunken Faun, bronze, in the gardens of the Museum of Fine Arts of Lyon, 1863
 marble figure of Petrarch, at the Hôtel de la Païva, Paris, circa 1863
 Napoleon seated on an eagle dominating the world, plaster, at the Musée d'Orsay, 1869
 the 1871 tomb of Generals Jacques Léon Clément-Thomas and Claude Lecomte, two of the first casualties of the Paris Commune, in the 4th division of Père Lachaise Cemetery in Paris, with architect Ernest Coquart 
 Monument to the Battle of Callao, with a finial figure of Nike, historical and allegorical bronzes, and friezes of the battle, for Plaza Dos de Mayo, Lima, Peru, circa 1873
 interior allegorical figures of Paving and Gas for the Palais Garnier, Paris, circa 1874
 pediment figures of Justice and Strength in the Court of Cassation, Paris, circa 1879
 Young Jupiter, a cast bronze copy dated 1886, at the Seventh Regiment Armory, Upper East Side, New York City
 two bronze medallions for the grave of Pierre-Alexandre Lafabrègue and his wife, Père Lachaise Cemetery
 four monumental vases representing the four seasons, in the gardens of the Bourges Cathedral

References 

1835 births
1894 deaths
École des Beaux-Arts alumni
Artists from Paris
Chevaliers of the Légion d'honneur
French architectural sculptors
Prix de Rome for sculpture
19th-century French sculptors
French male sculptors
19th-century French male artists